Database Workbench is a software application for development and administration of multiple relational databases using SQL, with interoperationality between different database systems, developed by Upscene Productions.

Because Databases Workbench supports multiple database systems, it can provide software developers with the same interface and development environment for these otherwise different database systems and also includes cross database tools.

Development 

Database Workbench started out as a developer tool specifically for InterBase, "InterBase Workbench", initially modeled after the SQL Navigator tool for Oracle Database by Quest Software. During its early years, InterBase became open-source for a short while, and soon after Firebird was created as a fork from the InterBase code base. The main developer of Database Workbench, Martijn Tonies, was closely involved in the early development of Firebird, has been a committee member of the Firebird Foundation and continues to be a Foundation member and sponsor.

Database Workbench continued to support both database systems, initially through a separate "Firebird Workbench" release. Not long after, the program became interoperational between the different database systems and this initial support for multiple database systems led to the renaming of the product to its current title "Database Workbench" in 2003. It also opened the path to the inclusion of support for more database systems: support for Microsoft SQL Server and MySQL was added in 2003; in 2005, support for Oracle Database and NexusDB was added and SQL Anywhere support followed in 2008. Early 2010, a full Unicode version of Database Workbench was released and version 5 of Database Workbench was released in August 2014. In December 2021, Database Workbench 6 was released with a revamped user interface including a more consistent look and feel and the multi-threaded loading of database metadata. This version introduced the Enterprise Edition with its TeamServer component. A free version with limited functionality, Data Workbench Lite, based on Data Workbench 4 is also available.

Supported databases and environments 

Database Workbench supports the following relational databases: Oracle Database, Microsoft SQL Server, SQL Anywhere, Firebird, NexusDB, InterBase, MySQL, MariaDB and PostgreSQL Version 6 of Database Workbench is a 64-bit application for Windows platforms, previous versions were 32-bit. Under Linux, FreeBSD or Mac OS X Database Workbench can operate using Wine.

Features 

Database Workbench can be used to view, create and edit tables, indexes, stored procedures and other database meta data objects. It also supports:
 visual database design/diagramming, both conceptual and physical, including reverse engineering
 testing SQL queries and viewing query plans
 step-by-step debugging of stored routines
 generating test data
 transferring data between database systems (DataPump)
 import and export of data
 database schema compare and change script creation
 database schema migration, also from one database system to another
 visual privilege management
 dependency browsing
 open ODBC or ADO data sources and MS Access databases
 manage security items like users, groups and roles
 create custom reports based on database queries
 print database schema, source code, lists of objects or query result sets
 BLOB (binary large object) editor with support for images, HTML, PDF and RTF, DOC and DOCX documents

It includes several productivity features:
 Favorite Databases for easy access to your most used databases
 SQL Insight including "Join Completion"
 Parameter Insight
 Code Templates
 Object Templates
 Name Templates
 Two-way Visual Query Builder

History 
 Initially created by as InterBase Workbench
 Version 1: 2001
 Version 1.4: 2002, Firebird Workbench to only work with Firebird. InterBase Workbench works with both Firebird and InterBase.
 Version 2: 2003, renamed Database Workbench with modular approach for supported database systems, Microsoft SQL Server, MySQL, Oracle and NexusDB support added.
 Version 3: 2007, SQL Anywhere support added.
 Version 4: 2010, fully Unicode enabled.
 Version 5: 2014, High DPI aware and support for PostgreSQL added.
 Version 6: 2021, Enterprise Edition added, a special multi-user version with central repository of servers, databases and workspaces and a database Version Control System.

References

External links 
 Database Workbench website

Database administration tools
Data modeling tools
MySQL
Firebird (database server)
Interbase
Oracle database tools
Microsoft database software
MariaDB
PL/SQL_editors
PostgreSQL